Burtt is an English surname. Notable people with the surname include:

 Ben Burtt (born 1948), American sound editor
 Benjamin A. Burtt (born 1984), American sound editor, son of Ben
 Brian Burtt (1913-2008), English botanist and taxonomist 
 Edward H. Burtt, Jr. (1948–2016), American ornithologist, writer, and educator
 Edwin Arthur Burtt (1892–1989), American philosopher
 Joseph Burtt (1818–1876), British archivist
 Leighton Burtt (born 1984), New Zealand cricketer
 Steve Burtt Jr. (born 1984), American-Ukrainian basketball player
 Steve Burtt Sr. (born 1962), American basketball player
 Tom Burtt (1915–1988), New Zealand cricketer
 Wilson Bryant Burtt (1875-1957), American army officer

English-language surnames